MLW, or mlw, may refer to:

Sports 
 Maple Leaf Wrestling
 Major League Wrestling
 Major League Wiffle (MLW)

Transportation 
 Maximum landing weight, the maximum weight at which an aircraft is permitted to land
 MLW, the IATA code for Spriggs Payne Airport near Monrovia in Liberia
 MLW, the National Rail code for Marlow railway station in the county of Buckinghamshire, UK
 Montreal Locomotive Works, a former Canadian railway locomotive manufacturer

Other uses 
 Malawi, UNDP country code
 Master of Labour Welfare, a postgraduate degree course offered by some Indian Universities
 mlw, the ISO 639-3 code for the Moloko language spoken in northern Cameroon

See also